West Yorkshire Young Labour (WYYL) is a branch of Young Labour, the youth wing of the Labour Party, for members between the ages of 14 and 26 in the English county of West Yorkshire.

West Yorkshire Young Labour campaigns across the county for the Labour Party and focuses on both local and national issues that affect young people. Labour Young members also get involved in the Labour Party through local policy events, campaigning or by attending events and socials.

Structure

Relations to other organisations 
WYYL works closely with other youth sections of the Labour Party, particularly the national Young Labour organisation Labour Students, the Young Fabians and the youth sections of affiliated trade unions.

Internal structure 
The executive of WYYL is elected at the group's Annual General Meeting (AGM). After the AGM in May 2013, it was decided the committee would comprise the chair, Secretary, Vice Chair, Campaigns and Events Officer, TULO, Women's Officer, LGBT Officer, BAME Officer and Disabilities Officer. The new committee was elected on 29 June 2013 at Leeds Civic Hall.

Committee 
 Chair - Alice Smart
 Vice Chair - Freya Govus
 Secretary - Jake Johnstone
 Campaigns - Tom Clements
 Trade Union Liaison Officer - Jonathan Pryor

List of chairs
 2009 -  2011 - Yilmaz Mamedy
 2012 - 2013 - Ryan Jackson
 2013 - 2014 - Mark Sewards
 2014–Present - Alice Smart

Membership fee 
The national Labour Party membership fee for under-27s was reduced to one penny in December 2010; this fee lasted until May 2011. The fee has reverted to £1 for the first year of membership, with subsequent years charged at the standard rate.

References

Organisation of the Labour Party (UK)